Elsinboro Township is a township in Salem County, in the U.S. state of New Jersey. As of the 2020 United States census, the township's population was 1,001, a decrease of 35 (−3.4%) from the 2010 census count of 1,036, which in turn reflected a decline of 56 (−5.1%) from the 1,092 counted in the 2000 census.

Elsinboro's first mention dates back to May 12, 1701, though it was also mentioned in records on November 28, 1676. The details and date of its original incorporation are unknown. The township was incorporated by an act of the New Jersey Legislature on February 21, 1798, as one of New Jersey's original group of 104 townships. The township was named for Fort Nya Elfsborg.

History
At the time of European colonization in the 17th century the Delaware River was known as the South River and the Salem River was known as Varkens Kill, or Hogg Creek. In 1641, without having a patent, a group of 60 settlers (20 families) from the New Haven Colony (in today's Connecticut) purchased land along the kill from indigenous Lenape.

Shortly after Johan Björnsson Printz, governor of New Sweden, arrived in the colony in 1643, he instructed that Fort Nya Elfsborg be built. Named after the Old Älvsborg Fortress off shore from Gothenburg, Sweden, it was located on the Delaware River between Salem River and Alloway Creek. In 1655 Peter Stuyvesant, on behalf of the Dutch West India Company, re-asserted control over the region, which was later captured by the British in 1664.

Geography
According to the United States Census Bureau, the township had a total area of 13.34 square miles (34.56 km2), including 11.93 square miles (30.90 km2) of land and 1.41 square miles (3.66 km2) of water (10.58%).

The Salem River flows along a portion of the township's northern boundary, and Alloway Creek flows along its southern boundary. Elsinboro Township contains the site of former Fort Elfsborg. Money Island is located in the southwestern corner of the township.

Elsinboro Township borders Lower Alloways Creek Township, Pennsville Township and Salem. Elsinboro also borders the Delaware Bay.

Unincorporated communities, localities and place names located partially or completely within the township include Elsinboro Neck, Elsinboro Point, Hagerville, Mill Creek Cove, Moores Corner, Oakwood Beach and Sinnickson Landing.

Demographics

2010 census

The Census Bureau's 2006–2010 American Community Survey showed that (in 2010 inflation-adjusted dollars) median household income was $64,107 (with a margin of error of +/− $9,891) and the median family income was $73,333 (+/− $14,834). Males had a median income of $59,904 (+/− $5,192) versus $42,188 (+/− $14,368) for females. The per capita income for the borough was $31,008 (+/− $2,997). About 1.5% of families and 2.5% of the population were below the poverty line, including 3.9% of those under age 18 and none of those age 65 or over.

2000 census
As of the 2000 United States census there were 1,092 people, 468 households, and 324 families residing in the township. The racial makeup of the township was 95.05% White, 3.57% African American, 0.18% Native American, 0.27% from other races, and 0.92% from two or more races. Hispanic or Latino of any race were 0.64% of the population.

There were 468 households, out of which 24.6% had children under the age of 18 living with them, 57.7% were married couples living together, 8.1% had a female householder with no husband present, and 30.6% were non-families. 26.3% of all households were made up of individuals, and 13.2% had someone living alone who was 65 years of age or older. The average household size was 2.33 and the average family size was 2.80.

In the township the population was spread out, with 21.2% under the age of 18, 5.0% from 18 to 24, 25.8% from 25 to 44, 28.2% from 45 to 64, and 19.8% who were 65 years of age or older. The median age was 44 years. For every 100 females, there were 90.2 males. For every 100 females age 18 and over, there were 91.8 males.

The median income for a household in the township was $50,972, and the median income for a family was $59,688. Males had a median income of $42,232 versus $30,357 for females. The per capita income for the township was $25,415. About 2.1% of families and 1.7% of the population were below the poverty line, including 0.9% of those under age 18 and 2.3% of those age 65 or over.

Government

Local government
Elsinboro Township is governed under the Township form of New Jersey municipal government, one of 141 municipalities (of the 564) statewide that use this form, the second-most commonly used form of government in the state. The governing body comprised of the Township Committee, whose three members are elected directly by the voters at-large in partisan elections to serve three-year terms of office on a staggered basis, with one seat coming up for election each year as part of the November general election in a three-year cycle. At an annual reorganization meeting, the Township Committee selects one of its members to serve as Mayor.

, members of the Elsinboro Township Committee are Mayor Sean M. Elwell (R, term on committee ends December 31, 2024; term as mayor ends December 31, 2022), Deputy Mayor Joseph McAllister (R, term on committee ends 2023 and term as deputy mayor ends 2022) and Douglas L. Hogate (D, 2022).

Federal, state and county representation 
Elsinboro Township is located in the 2nd Congressional District and is part of New Jersey's 3rd state legislative district.

 

Salem County is governed by a five-member Board of County Commissioners who are elected at-large to serve three-year terms of office on a staggered basis, with either one or two seats coming up for election each year. At an annual reorganization meeting held in the beginning of January, the board selects a Director and a Deputy Director from among its members. , Salem County's Commissioners (with party, residence and term-end year listed in parentheses) are 
Director Benjamin H. Laury (R, Elmer, term as commissioner ends December 31, 2024; term as director ends 2022), 
Deputy Director Gordon J. "Mickey" Ostrum, Jr. (R, Pilesgrove Township, term as commissioner ends 2024; term as deputy director ends 2022),  
R. Scott Griscom (R, Mannington Township, 2022), 
Edward A. Ramsay (R, Pittsgrove Township, 2023) and
Lee R. Ware (D, Elsinboro Township, 2022). Constitutional officers elected on a countywide basis are 
County Clerk Dale A. Cross (R, 2024),
Sheriff Charles M. Miller (R, 2024) and 
Surrogate Nicki A. Burke (D, 2023).

Politics
As of March 2011, there were a total of 849 registered voters in Elsinboro Township, of which 234 (27.6% vs. 30.6% countywide) were registered as Democrats, 221 (26.0% vs. 21.0%) were registered as Republicans and 392 (46.2% vs. 48.4%) were registered as Unaffiliated. There were 2 voters registered as Libertarians. Among the township's 2010 Census population, 81.9% (vs. 64.6% in Salem County) were registered to vote, including 99.9% of those ages 18 and over (vs. 84.4% countywide).

In the 2012 presidential election, Republican Mitt Romney received 59.2% of the vote (374 cast), ahead of Democrat Barack Obama with 38.3% (242 votes), and other candidates with 2.5% (16 votes), among the 636 ballots cast by the township's 872 registered voters (4 ballots were spoiled), for a turnout of 72.9%. In the 2008 presidential election, Republican John McCain received 386 votes (58.3% vs. 46.6% countywide), ahead of Democrat Barack Obama with 248 votes (37.5% vs. 50.4%) and other candidates with 16 votes (2.4% vs. 1.6%), among the 662 ballots cast by the township's 870 registered voters, for a turnout of 76.1% (vs. 71.8% in Salem County). In the 2004 presidential election, Republican George W. Bush received 421 votes (61.2% vs. 52.5% countywide), ahead of Democrat John Kerry with 262 votes (38.1% vs. 45.9%) and other candidates with 4 votes (0.6% vs. 1.0%), among the 688 ballots cast by the township's 875 registered voters, for a turnout of 78.6% (vs. 71.0% in the whole county).

In the 2013 gubernatorial election, Republican Chris Christie received 71.1% of the vote (356 cast), ahead of Democrat Barbara Buono with 26.9% (135 votes), and other candidates with 2.0% (10 votes), among the 504 ballots cast by the township's 861 registered voters (3 ballots were spoiled), for a turnout of 58.5%. In the 2009 gubernatorial election, Republican Chris Christie received 266 votes (50.9% vs. 46.1% countywide), ahead of Democrat Jon Corzine with 178 votes (34.0% vs. 39.9%), Independent Chris Daggett with 69 votes (13.2% vs. 9.7%) and other candidates with 7 votes (1.3% vs. 2.0%), among the 523 ballots cast by the township's 877 registered voters, yielding a 59.6% turnout (vs. 47.3% in the county).

Education
The Elsinboro Township School District public school students in kindergarten through eighth grade at Elsinboro Township School. As of the 2020–21 school year, the district, comprised of one school, had an enrollment of 115 students and 14.3 classroom teachers (on an FTE basis), for a student–teacher ratio of 8.0:1. In the 2016–17 school year, Elsinboro was tied as the 18th-smallest enrollment of any school district in the state, with 129 students.

Public school students in ninth through twelfth grades attend Salem High School in Salem City, together with students from Lower Alloways Creek Township, Mannington Township and Quinton Township, as part of a sending/receiving relationship with the Salem City School District. As of the 2020–21 school year, the high school had an enrollment of 383 students and 41.0 classroom teachers (on an FTE basis), for a student–teacher ratio of 9.3:1.

Transportation

No Interstate, U.S., state or major county highways serve Elsinboro Township. The only numbered roads are minor county routes, such as County Route 624.

Notable people

People who were born in, residents of, or otherwise closely associated with Elsinboro Township include:

 George Hires (1835–1911), represented New Jersey's 1st congressional district in the United States House of Representatives from 1885 to 1889
 Pauline Waddington Holme (1848–1940), temperance and suffrage activist
 Esther "Hetty" Saunders (1793–1862), poet of African American descent, born into slavery, who escaped to freedom with her family and lived most of her life in Elsinboro

References

External links

Elsinboro Township Website
Elsinboro Township School

School Data for the Elsinboro Township School, National Center for Education Statistics
History of Elsinboro

 
1798 establishments in New Jersey
Populated places established in 1798
Township form of New Jersey government
Townships in Salem County, New Jersey
New Jersey populated places on the Delaware River